BearCity is a 2010 American gay-themed comedy-drama film directed by Doug Langway, and written by Langway and Lawrence Ferber. It stars Joe Conti as a young gay man in the "twink" category who fantasizes about larger, hairier men known as "bears", and his search to find the perfect man.

The sequel BearCity 2: The Proposal was released in the fall of 2012. BearCity 3 was funded by an Indiegogo crowdfunding campaign, and had a limited release at various LGBT festivals and venues in 2016, and received a full release digitally and on home media in 2017.

A novelization of the film, also written by Lawrence Ferber, was published by Lethe Press' Bear Bones imprint in 2013.

Plot
Tyler, an aspiring actor in his early twenties, has just moved to New York City in an attempt to jump-start his career. Young and slender, he fits in the "twink" category, but finds himself attracted to "bears", hairy and larger-bodied men. Tyler realizes his expectations of sexual escapades are falling far short of what he would have liked, while simultaneously falling for Roger, the muscle-bear friend of his roommates Fred and Brent. Meanwhile, Roger fears judgment for being with someone from outside the community, and hesitates to introduce Tyler to his friends.

Cast

Joe Conti as Tyler
Stephen Guarino as Brent
Brian Keane as Fred
Gregory Gunter as Michael
Sebastian La Cause as Fernando
Alex Di Dio as Simon
James Martinez as Carlos
Gerald McCullouch as Roger
Ashlie Atkinson as Amy

References

External links

2010 films
2010 comedy-drama films
2010 LGBT-related films
American independent films
American LGBT-related films
Bear (gay culture)
2010s English-language films
Films shot in New York City
LGBT-related comedy-drama films
New York City in fiction
American comedy-drama films
Gay-related films
2010 independent films
2010s American films